Shaikh Syed Abul Hassab Musa Pak Shaheed was Sufi and his mausoleum is located at Multan, Punjab, Pakistan. Shaikh Syed Abul Hassab was son of Syed Hamid Bakhsh Gilani.His shrine is situated in historical city of Multan. Syed Musa Pak buried near Pak Gate inside the wall city of Multan, Punjab, Pakistan. The Urs of Syed Musa Pak Shaheed takes place annually at his Mausoleum in Multan.(11ve Wali Sarkar).

Further reading 

People from Multan
Mughal Empire Sufis
Punjabi people
1592 deaths
Year of birth unknown
Punjabi Sufis
Shrines in Pakistan
Multan District

www.musapak.com

See also 
 Multan
 Baha-ud-din Zakariya
 Rukn-e-Alam
 Shaikh Sama'al-Din Kamboh

People from Multan
Mughal Empire Sufis
Punjabi people
1592 deaths
Year of birth unknown
Punjabi Sufis
Shrines in Pakistan
Multan District